Gone Not Around Any Longer is the first extended play released by South Korean girl group Sistar's sub-unit Sistar19. It was released as a CD and online as a single on January 31, 2013 through Starship Entertainment.

The song was a commercial success, peaking at number 1 on the Gaon Digital Chart, Gaon Download Chart, and Gaon Streaming Chart. The song has been streamed over 37,190,626 times and has sold over 1,723,704 downloads as of 2013.

Release
On January 24, 2013 Sistar19 has released teaser photos for their comeback and revealed that their new song will be releasing on January 31. Sistar19 was featured in a "bed pictorial" concept wearing  knitwear while posing on a bed.

On January 28, 2013 Sistar19 released the teaser for their upcoming song "Gone Not Around Any Longer"!
On January 31, 2013, the full Single and music video for "Gone Not Around Any Longer" were released simultaneously; the music video features actor Ahn Jae-hyun. The single was an immediate commercial success, gaining two "perfect all-kills" by hitting number one on all major Korean music charts and maintaining the position for two weeks. In addition, the song gained them their first number one on the Billboard "Korea K-Pop Hot 100" chart.

On February 7, 2013, Sistar19 released the rehearsal video for the track.

Promotion
Sistar19 had their comeback stage on M Countdown on January 31, 2013. The group also performed "Gone Not Around Any Longer" on various music shows such as Music Bank, Show! Music Core and Inkigayo in February. The song "SISTAR19" was used for the comeback week special performances.  The song gave the group their first TV music show award on M Countdown on February 7.

Music program awards

Track listing

Personnel
Hyorin – vocals
Bora – rap
Brave Brothers – producing, songwriting, arranger, music

Charts

Album

Sales

Single

Gone Not Around Any Longer

Other charted songs

Release history

References

2013 EPs
Korean-language EPs
Sistar albums